P. Ramalingom (February 1916 – 27 July 2006) was an Indian politician and leader of Communist Party of India (CPI). He represented  Adoor constituency in 3rd Kerala Legislative Assembly elected in the 1967 Kerala Legislative Assembly election.

Political career
Ramalingam joined the Travancore State Congress in 1939 and joined the Communist Party of India in 1941. Member of AITUC the State Council.  He has also served as a State Council Member of CPI, Plantation Corporation Board Member, Kencos Chairman, Ezhamkulam Grama Panchayat President, Kunnathoor Plantation Workers Union Founding President and Central Wage Board for Rubber Industry member. 

He died on 27 July 2006.

References

Communist Party of India politicians from Kerala